Bredo Greve is a Norwegian anarchist and filmmaker, who made 3 feature-length films and 12 short films, from 1966 to 1986. His films handle social critical subjects, such as nature conservation, critique of technology and modern society. Most of them share a pessimistic view about the future, but often with a touch of humor. He was also known for making movies on an extreme low budget, usually shooting on 16 mm. Having all his own film equipment, he was very self-reliant, and an independent filmmaker in the true sense of the word.

In 1976 he got a lot of media-attention for his film The Stone Wood Witches. It was an unconventional and controversial film about the teachings of a modern witch, inspired by Carlos Castaneda's books about Don Juan. Many people found it to be “morally degrading and anti-christian”. Among them was the cinema manager in the city of Hønefoss, who denied to screen the movie because of its morals. In protest Bredo screened the movie outside on the wall of the cinema, which led into a lawsuit plus many debates about Norwegian film politics.

Although Bredo Greve was an outspoken and well-known figure in the Norwegian film community back in the 70’s, most people today don’t know who he is. None of his films are out on DVD, and have never been commercially released on VHS. Still he has left a deep impact on many of those who experienced his movies back in their time.

Among Bredo Greve’s most important works are: That Fancy Furcoat of Yours (1977), The Stone Wood Witches (1976) and Film a Wonderful World (1978).

Literature
 Serigstad, Aleksander U. :  	På utkanten av norsk film : en studie av Bredo Greves filmer. Lillehammer : Høgskolen i Lillehammer, 2012
 Gulbrandsen, Tom: Filmens vidunderlige verden : en filmteoretisk diskusjon og en narrativ analyse av en norsk spillefilm. Oslo : Universitetet, 2000
 Greve, Bredo: I fengsel. Dagbok fra Mashad, Iran. Oslo : Alternativ bokklubb, 1976

External links 

 
 Norwegian tv interview
 Filmjunkiene - Norwegian film company that is currently making a documentary about Bredo Greve

1939 births
Living people
Norwegian film directors
Norwegian screenwriters
Norwegian film producers
Norwegian male film actors